Tango n' Vectif is the debut studio album by English electronic music producers Mike Paradinas and Francis Naughton under the stage name μ-Ziq. It was released in November 1993 by Rephlex. The cover photo of the original release was taken by Richard D. James.

Tango n' Vectif was re-released on 1 October 2001 as a double CD with additional tracks that were on the original vinyl and CD releases as well as the "Phi * 1700" single.

Reception

In a positive review, Rupert Howe of Select stated that "like many of the Rephlex releases, it may sound rough-hewn, but there's nothing unsophisticated about the music."

Track listing

References

External links
 

Mike Paradinas albums
1993 debut albums
Rephlex Records albums
Ambient techno albums